Table of genes implicated in development and differentiation of the intestinal epithelium

The table listed below is a running comprehensive list of all intestinal differential genes that have been reported in the literature.  The PMID is the pubmed identification number of the papers that support the summarized information in the table corresponding to each row.

References 

Developmental genes and proteins